Biggar Castle was a 12th-century castle in Biggar, South Lanarkshire, Scotland. It appears to have been abandoned by the 14th century.

History
The motte and bailey castle was built in the 12th century by Baldwin of Biggar, who received the barony of Biggar from David I of Scotland. Baldwin and his son Waltheof were Sheriffs of Lanarkshire.

It passed to the Fleming family in the 13th century with an heiress of Biggar and was held by the Fleming family until the 14th century. The Fleming family abandoned the castle for Boghall Castle. The motte is still extant of the castle.

Citations

References
 
CANMORE - Biggar, High Street
CANMORE - Biggar

History of Fleming Family (multiple books) by F. Lawrence Fleming 

12th-century establishments in Scotland
Demolished buildings and structures in Scotland
Ruined castles in Scotland
Castles in South Lanarkshire